Mesmerized is an EP by the Norwegian Christian metal band Extol and their second official release. It was released on Endtime Productions and Solid State Records.

Track listing
All songs written by Extol.
"Enthralled" - 3:58
"The Prodigal Son" - 6:05
"Storms of Disillusion" - 5:12
"Burial (Sanctum remix)" - 8:31
"Renhetens Elv (Sanctum remix)" - 4:24
"Work of Art (Raison d'Etre remix)" - 6:30

Tracks 4 to 6 are all industrial remixes of tracks from the Burial album.

Personnel
Extol
Peter Espevoll - lead vocals
Ole Børud - guitar, vocals
Christer Espevoll - guitar
Eystein Holm - bass guitar
David Husvik - drums, backing vocals

References

1999 EPs
Extol albums
Solid State Records EPs